The Drab Atlantic tree-rat (Phyllomys dasythrix) is a spiny rat species found in Brazil.

References

Phyllomys
Mammals described in 1872